The Serbian Orthodox Eparchy of Australia and New Zealand is an Eastern Orthodox diocese of the Serbian Orthodox Church, with jurisdiction over Australia and New Zealand. Since 2011, it has an honorary rank of Metropolitanate. Its headquarters are in Renwick Street, Alexandria, City of Sydney, New South Wales, Australia. Bishop Siluan (Mrakić) of Australia and New Zealand was enthroned on 22 October 2016 at the St. George Historic Cathedral in Cabramatta by Longin (Krčo) of the Diocese of New Gracanica - Midwestern America.

The Metropolitanate has 51 parishes and monasteries in Australia in New South Wales, Australian Capital Territory, Victoria, Northern Territory, Queensland, Western Australia, Tasmania, South Australia and in New Zealand.

Serbian Orthodox monasteries in Australia
 "Saint Sava" - New Kalenich Serbian Orthodox Monastery, Hall - Wallaro, New South Wales
 "Protection Of The Most Holy Theotokos" Serbian Orthodox Monastery, Tallong, Marulan, New South Wales
 "Saint Sava" Serbian Orthodox Monastery, Elaine, Victoria
 "Nativity Of The Most Holy Theotokos" Serbian Orthodox Skete, Inglewood, South Australia

There is a growing monastic presence in the Serbian Orthodox Metropolitanate of Australia and New Zealand.

Former Hierarchs of Australia and New Zealand, Patriarchal Diocese
 Bishop Dionisije (Milivojević) of United States and Canada, 1939-1964 (defrocked in 1964)
 Bishop Lavrentije (Trifunović) of Western Europe, Australia and New Zealand, 1964-1974
 Bishop Nikolai (Mrdja) of Australia and New Zealand, 1974-1980
 Bishop Vasilije (Vadić) of Australia and New Zealand, 1980-1986
 Bishop Longin (Krčo) of Australia and New Zealand, 1986-1992
 Bishop Luka (Kovačević) of Australia and New Zealand, 1993-1999
 Bishop Irinej Dobrijević of Australia and New Zealand, 2006-2016

Former Hierarchs of Australia and New Zealand, Free Serbian (1963-1992) and New Gracanica (1992-2000)
(Considered schismatic by the Serbian Orthodox Church until reconciliation in 1991-1992)
 Bishop Dionisije (Milivojević) of United States and Canada, 1963-1966
 Bishop Dimitrije (Balač) of America and Canada, 1966-1979
 Bishop Petar (Bankerović) of Australia and New Zealand, 1979-1988
 Metropolitan Irenej (Kovačević) of America and Canada, 1988-1991 (as Administrator)
 Bishop Vasilije (Veinović) of Australia and New Zealand, 1991-1993
 Bishop Sava (Jurić) of Australia and New Zealand, 1994-1999

Former Hierarchs of the New Gracanica and for the Patriarchal Dioceses
(Between 1999 and 2006, the bishop of the New Gracanica Diocese administered the Patriarchal Diocese)
 Bishop Nikanor (Bogunović) of Australia and New Zealand, 1999-2003
 Bishop Milutin (Knežević) of Australia and New Zealand. 2003-2006

See also

 Serbian Australians
 Australian-Serbian relations

Gallery

References

External links
 Diocese of Australia and New Zealand 
 Archpastoral Paschal Message of His Grace Bishop Irinej of Australia and New Zealand 
 Unity of the Church in Australia and New Zealand is desire of whole Serbdom

Religious sees of the Serbian Orthodox Church
Serbian Orthodox Church in Australia
Serbian Orthodox Church in New Zealand
Serbian-Australian culture
Serbian-New Zealand culture